Carmarthen East and Dinefwr is a constituency of the Senedd. It elects one Member of the Senedd by the first past the post method of election. Also, however, it is one of eight constituencies in the Mid and West Wales electoral region, which elects four additional members, in addition to eight constituency members, to produce a degree of proportional representation for the region as a whole.

It had been held since its formation in 1999 by the Plaid Cymru politician, Rhodri Glyn Thomas until his retirement in 2016. It is now held by Plaid Cymru politician Adam Price, who became leader of the party in 2018.

Boundaries

1999 to 2007 
The constituency was created for the first election to the Assembly, in 1999, with the name and boundaries of the Carmarthen East and Dinefwr Westminster constituency. It was a Dyfed constituency, one of five constituencies covering, and entirely within, the preserved county of Dyfed.

The other four Dyfed constituencies were Carmarthen West and South Pembrokeshire, Ceredigion, Llanelli and Preseli Pembrokeshire. They were all within the Mid and West Wales electoral region.

The region consisted of the eight constituencies of Brecon and Radnorshire, Carmarthen East and Dinefwr, Carmarthen West and South Pembrokeshire, Ceredigion, Llanelli, Meirionnydd Nant Conwy, Montgomeryshire and Preseli Pembrokeshire.

From 2007 
The constituency includes the whole of 41 Carmarthenshire communities (Abergwili; Ammanford; Betws; Cenarth; Cilycwm; Cwmamman; Cynwyl Gaeo; Dyffryn Cennen; Gorslas; Llanarthney; Llanddarog; Llanddeusant; Llandeilo; Llandovery; Llandybie; Llandyfaelog; Llanegwad; Llanfair-ar-y-bryn; Llanfihangel Aberbythych; Llanfihangel-ar-Arth; Llanfihangel Rhos-y-Corn; Llanfynydd; Llangadog; Llangathen; Llangeler; Llangunnor; Llangyndeyrn; Llanllawddog; Llanllwni; Llansadwrn; Llansawel; Llanwrda; Llanybydder; Llanycrwys; Manordeilo and Salem; Myddfai; Newcastle Emlyn; Pencarreg; Quarter Bach; St Ishmael; Talley).

Boundaries changed for the 2007 Assembly election. Carmarthen East and Dinefwr remains one of five Dyfed constituencies and one of eight constituencies in the Mid and West Wales region. 
However, boundaries within Dyfed changed, to realign them with local government ward boundaries and to reduce the disparities in the sizes of constituency electorates, and the boundaries of the region changed, to align them with the boundaries of preserved counties.

The other four Dyfed constituencies are, again, Carmarthen West and South Pembrokeshire, Ceredigion, Llanelli and Preseli Pembrokeshire, all within the Mid and West Wales electoral region.

The region consists of the constituencies of Brecon and Radnorshire, Carmarthen East and Dinefwr, Carmarthen West and South Pembrokeshire, Ceredigion, Dwyfor Meirionnydd, Llanelli, Montgomeryshire and Preseli Pembrokeshire.

For Westminster purposes, the same new constituency boundaries became effective for the 2010 United Kingdom general election.

Voting 
In general elections for the Senedd, each voter has two votes. The first vote may be used to vote for a candidate to become the Member of the Senedd for the voter's constituency, elected by the first past the post system. The second vote may be used to vote for a regional closed party list of candidates. Additional member seats are allocated from the lists by the d'Hondt method, with constituency results being taken into account in the allocation.

Assembly members and Members of the Senedd

Elections

Elections in the 2020s

Elections in the 2010s 

Regional ballots rejected: 132

Elections in the 2000s 

2003 Electorate: 54,110
Regional ballots rejected: 239

Elections in the 1990s

References 

Senedd constituencies in the Mid and West Wales electoral region
1999 establishments in Wales
Constituencies established in 1999
Politics of Carmarthenshire